Tuyuca (also Dochkafuara, Tejuca, Tuyuka, Dojkapuara, Doxká-Poárá, Doka-Poara, or Tuiuca) is an Eastern Tucanoan language (similar to Tucano). Tuyuca is spoken by the Tuyuca, an indigenous ethnic group of some 500-1000 people, who inhabit the watershed of the Papuri River, the Inambú River, and the Tiquié River, in Vaupés Department, Colombia, and Amazonas State, Brazil.

Grammar
Tuyuca is a postpositional agglutinative subject–object–verb language with mandatory type II evidentiality. Five evidentiality paradigms are used: visual, nonvisual, apparent, second-hand, and assumed, but second-hand evidentiality exists only in the past tense, and apparent evidentiality does not occur in the first-person present tense. The language is estimated to have 50 to 140 noun classes.

Phonology 

Vowels

Consonants

Contrasts
The following words show some of the consonant contrasts.

Bilabial contrasts
  'mom'
  'plate'
  'payment'

Alveolar contrasts
  'a fish'
  'dragonfly'
  'party'
  'whitening'

Velar and palatal contrasts
  'ant-eater'
  'aunt'
  'plantain'
  'thread'

Variation
  Voiceless plosives  have aspirated variants that tend to occur before high vowels but not near voiceless vowels. There are a few degrees of the amount of aspiration.
 Preglottalized variants of  occur together at the onset.
 Preglottalized forms of  occur in the onset and are in free variation with their plain counterparts.
 Prenasal variants of  occur after nasal vowels and before oral vowels:  .

Nasal assimilation
 Voiced consonants  have nasal variants at the same place of articulation before nasal vowels: .
 The  can also surface as  before high nasal vowels.
 The  also has a nasalized variant that occurs before nasal vowels.

Nasal harmony
Segments in a word are either all nasal or all oral.
  'to go'

Note that voiceless segments are transparent.

  'choke on a bone'
  'demon'

See further remarks regarding the oral/nasal nature of affixes in the Morphophonemics section.

Suprasegmental features 
Tuyuca's two suprasegmental features are tone and nasalization.

Tone 
There is a high tone (H) and a low tone (L) in Tuyuca. The phonological word has only one high tone, which may occur in any syllable of the word. The low tone has two variants: a mid-tone, which occurs in words with at least three syllables in free variation, and the low tone, which occurs in internal syllables that have  that is contiguous to the high tone but not preceded by a low tone.

 The accent is the same as high tone.
 The tone is contrastive in (C)VV syllables.
  'blood'
  'mud'
 (C)VCV words, except for loanwords, have the tone on the second syllable.
  'parakeet'
  'table' (← Portuguese 'mesa')

Nasalization
Nasalization is phonemic and operates at the root level.
  'to kill'
  'to tie'

Phonetic distribution and syllabic structure
A syllable is any unit that may take tone and has a vocalic nucleus, regardless of whether or not it has a consonant before it.

Restrictions
  and  do not occur word-initially
  and  do not occur.
 Multisyllabic VVV strings occur, but not all combinations of vowels are attested.  is always last in such strings.
 (C)V may be optionally be pronounced with aspiration, with the same quality as the preceding vowel, when the syllable is both unstressed and before syllables with voiceless onsets.

Morphophonemics 
All affixes are in one of the two classes:
 Oral affixes that may undergo nasalization, like the plural morpheme -ri:  'marks'
 Affixes that are intrinsically oral or nasal and are not changed.

When a nasal CV suffix occurs and C is a continuant or a vibrant /r/, regressive nasalization is undergone by the preceding vowel.

References

External links
 Tuyuca language dictionary online from IDS (select simple or advanced browsing)
 ELAR archive of Brazilian Tuyuka language documentation materials
 Barnes, Janet; Silzer, Sheryl (1976). "Fonología del tuyuca". Sistemas fonológicos de idiomas colombianos (SIL) 3
 Barnes, Janet (1974). "Notes on Tuyuca discourse, paragraph and sentence".
 Tuyuca (Intercontinental Dictionary Series)

Agglutinative languages
Languages of Brazil
Languages of Colombia
Tucanoan languages